

Northern Africa

Central Africa

Southern Africa

Western Africa

Eastern Africa

See also

Notes

Southern Africa